Judit Tóth (27 December 1906 – 9 January 1993) was a Hungarian gymnast who competed in the 1928 Summer Olympics and in the 1936 Summer Olympics.

References

External links
 

1906 births
1993 deaths
Hungarian female artistic gymnasts
Olympic gymnasts of Hungary
Gymnasts at the 1928 Summer Olympics
Gymnasts at the 1936 Summer Olympics
Olympic bronze medalists for Hungary
Olympic medalists in gymnastics
Medalists at the 1936 Summer Olympics
20th-century Hungarian women